The Royal Oak is a Grade II listed public house at 34 Barton Lane, Eccles, Salford M30 0EN.

It is on the Campaign for Real Ale's National Inventory of Historic Pub Interiors.

It was built in 1904 by Mr Newton of the architects Hartley, Hacking & Co, for Holt's Brewery.

See also
Pub names#Royal Oak

References

Grade II listed pubs in Greater Manchester
National Inventory Pubs
Grade II listed buildings in the City of Salford
Eccles, Greater Manchester